Setkya Dewi (22 December 1813 – 12 November 1876), commonly known by her regnal title Thiri Pavara Mahayazeinda Yadana Dewi, was the empress consort and chief wife of King Mindon Min during the Konbaung dynasty. She had strong influence with her husband and was renowned for her knowledge of modern science and astrology. She was popular with the British, who described her as a well-educated woman (a "bluestocking"), and visitors would often bring her gifts related to her astrological interests. She was also known for her extraordinary kindness.

Biography
Setkya Devi was born on 22 December 1813 to King Tharrawaddy and his consort Kyapin Mibaya. She had seven siblings, five of whom died young; King Pagan was her younger brother. She was granted the appanages of Sagaing, Myedu, Kyangyun, Tharawaddy, and Della in fief from 1837 to 1851, which was later exchanged for Taunbaing in 1852. She was chosen as the Tabindaing Princess (who always remained unmarried in order to become the chief queen of the next monarch), or as the Einshe Hteik Hta Mibaya (Queen of the Crown Prince, အိမ်ရှေ့ထိပ်ထား မိဖုရား), by her father.  She acted as an adviser to her father and even had the authority to acquit people of crimes, a power which she kept until the reign of King Mindon. Through her intervention, fifteen people were absolved of their guilt, including Myawaddy Mingyi U Sa, Hsinbyumashin, Yaw Mingyi U Po Hlaing and Hlaing Hteik Khaung Tin. The acquittal of Yaw Mingyi, in particular, proved fruitful.

Death
She died in 1876 and was buried in the Mandalay Palace stockade. After her death, King Mindon paid her the respect of allowing no one to either enter her palace or comb his hair. As signs of grief he dressed in pure white and lived near her tomb, which was the third erected within the sacred precincts of the palace, the first being that of Khin The (the Queen of the Northern Palace), the favourite wife of King Mindon.

References

See also 
 Konbaung dynasty
 List of Burmese consorts

Konbaung dynasty
1813 births
1876 deaths
Burmese Buddhists
Chief queens consort of Konbaung dynasty